Joseph Cannon or Joe Cannon may refer to:

 Joseph A. Cannon (born 1949), former chairman of the Utah Republican Party and former chairman of Geneva Steel
 Joseph Gurney Cannon (1836–1926), U.S. Representative from Illinois and Speaker of the U.S. House of Representatives; nicknamed "Uncle Joe"
 Joseph J. Cannon (1877–1945), Utah politician, newspaper editor, and LDS Church leader
 Joe Cannon (baseball) (Joseph Jerome Cannon, born 1953), Major League Baseball outfielder
 Joe Cannon (soccer) (born 1975), American goalkeeper
 Joseph Cannon (socialist), American labor leader and socialist politician
 Joe B. Cannon (born 1935), American politician in the Texas House of Representatives